The Grotius Lectures is a series of annual lectures sponsored by the American Society of International Law since 1999.  The lecture is named in honour of the famous Dutch jurist, Hugo Grotius (1583–1645), considered by many to be the 'father of international law.'  Over the past decade, the lecture has been delivered by a leading international law scholar or international lawyer.  The lecture is customarily read at the opening of the annual meeting of the ASIL, usually held in late March or April each year.  

The American Grotius Lecture should not be confused with the annual Grotius Lecture held at the British Institute of International and Comparative Law (the successor to the Grotius Society).

See also
American Society of International Law
American University, Washington College of Law
American Journal of International Law
 The American University International Law Review (which publishes the annual Grotius Lecture)

Lecture series
International law organizations
Hugo Grotius
1999 establishments in the United States